The 1991–92 season in Argentina saw River Plate win the Apertura championship and Newell's Old Boys win the Clausura championship. In the international competitions Newell's were runners up in the Copa Libertadores and River Plate were runners up in the Supercopa Sudamericana.

Torneo Apertura ("Opening" Tournament)

 Teams highlighted in light blue qualified for the Octagonal tournament.

Top Scorers

Relegation

There is no relegation after the Apertura. For the relegation results of this tournament see below

Torneo Clausura ("Closing" Tournament)

Teams highlighted in light blue qualified for the Octagonal tournament.

Top Scorers

Relegation

Qualification for Copa Libertadores 1993

Champions qualification playoff

River Plate qualify for Copa Libertadores 1993

Octagonal tournament
Teams highlighted in light blue qualified for the Octagonal tournament.

Velez Sarsfield to play Newell's Old Boys in the Libertadores playoff.

Playoff final

Newell's Old Boys qualify for Copa Libertadores 1993.

Argentine clubs in international competitions

References

Argentina 1991-1992 by Pablo Ciullini  at rsssf.
Argentina 1990s by Osvaldo José Gorgazzi and Victor Hugo Kurhy at rsssf.
Copa Libertadores 1992 by Juan Pablo Andrés and Frank Ballesteros at rsssf.
Supercopa 1991 by Julio Bovi Diogo at rsssf

 

it:Campionato di calcio argentino 1991-1992
pl:I liga argentyńska w piłce nożnej (1991/1992)